John Lennon (1940–1980) was an English singer-songwriter and founding member of the Beatles.

John Lennon may also refer to:

People
John Lennon (Royal Navy officer) (1768–1846), British naval captain
John Brown Lennon (1850–1923), American labor union leader
Dennis Lennon or John Dennis Lennon (1918–1991), British architect, interior designer, and furniture designer
John Anthony Lennon (born 1950), American composer
John Charles Julian Lennon (born 1963), English singer, son of Beatles member John Lennon
John George Lennon (1858-1919), American businessman and politician
J. Robert Lennon (John Robert Lennon, born 1970), American novelist, short story writer, musician and composer
John Lennon (footballer) (born 1991), Brazilian footballer

Music
"John Lennon", a song by Arkells from Jackson Square
"John Lennon", a song by Hamell on Trial from The Chord is Mightier Than the Sword

Other uses
John Lennon Park, a park in Havana, Cuba
SS John B. Lennon, an American World War II Liberty ship
Lennon Wall or John Lennon Wall, a wall in Prague, Czech Republic
Liverpool John Lennon Airport

See also
John Lennon Hat, a popular name for a Mariner's cap